Fabian Arndt (born 8 September 1995) is a German footballer who plays as a forward for Heider SV.

Career
Arndt made his professional debut for Holstein Kiel in the 3. Liga on 25 January 2014, coming on as a substitute in the 61st minute for Marcel Schied in the 0–0 home draw against Stuttgarter Kickers.

References

External links
 Profile at DFB.de
 
 Profile at Fussball.de
 Weiche Flensburg II statistics 2016
 Weiche Flensburg II statistics 2017

1995 births
People from Nordfriesland
Footballers from Schleswig-Holstein
Living people
German footballers
Association football forwards
Holstein Kiel players
Holstein Kiel II players
SC Weiche Flensburg 08 players
3. Liga players
Regionalliga players
Oberliga (football) players